The Lovely Feathers are a Canadian indie rock band from Montreal, Quebec, Canada. They have played the South by Southwest, Pop Montreal and North By Northeast festivals several times. Their albums reached the top of Canadian and American college radio charts. They play eccentric indie pop with quirky lyrics.

History
The Lovely Feathers formed in 2004.  Their first album was an independent release titled My Best Friend Daniel.  Their second album (first official LP), Hind Hind Legs, was released on April 18, 2006 by EMI and Equator Records, followed by a North American tour with Metric.  It was produced by Jimmy Shaw of Metric and Drew Malamud.  Their third record, Fantasy of the Lot, was released on June 2, 2009 by EMI and Sparks Music.

In June 2009 their album Fantasy of the Lot was released. The album showed the band's more developed and consistent style.

The Lovely Feathers made two music videos. "Frantic", their single from Hind Hind Legs, was a playful, semi-animated video directed by artist Jon Rafman.  "Lowiza", off of Fantasy of the Lot, was a more traditional narrative about aging sexual impulses, directed by Alan Compton in 2009.

Their song 'Wrong Choice' was featured on the TV show One Tree Hill, and their song 'Frantic' was placed in an episode of Vice Guide to Travel. They have also performed live on MTV Live (Canada) twice.

After 2010, the band went into hiatus, but began performing again in 2014.

Discography

Albums
 My Best Friend Daniel (2005)
 Hind Hind Legs (2006)
 Fantasy of the Lot - June 2009 (Canadian release), August 2009 (US release)

Videography
 Frantic (2006) directed by Jon Rafman
 Lowiza (2009) directed by Alan Compton

See also

Music of Quebec
Canadian rock
List of bands from Canada

References

External links

Musical groups established in 2004
Canadian indie rock groups
Musical groups from Montreal
English-language musical groups from Quebec